The 1985–86 season was the 40th season in FK Partizan's existence. This article shows player statistics and matches that the club played during the 1985–86 season.

Friendlies

Players

Squad information
players (league matches/league goals): Fahrudin Omerović (34/0) -goalkeeper- Zvonko Varga (32/17) Ljubomir Radanović (32/4) Vladimir Vermezović (32/1) Admir Smajić (30/2) Slobodan Rojević (29/0) Goran Stevanović (28/3) Nebojša Vučićević (27/6) Miloš Đelmaš (26/11) Zvonko Živković (24/12) Bajro Župić (24/0) Milonja Đukić (23/1) Vlado Čapljić (21/3) Radoslav Nikodijević (17/0) Miodrag Bajović (15/0) Miodrag Radović (12/0) Milinko Pantić (9/2) Milorad Bajović (6/0) Dragan Mance (5/2) died 3 September 1985 in a car accident Goran Bogdanović (5/0) Jovica Kolb (4/1) Isa Sadriu (4/0)

Competitions

Yugoslav First League

Matches

Yugoslav Cup

UEFA Cup

First round

Second round

See also
 List of FK Partizan seasons

References

External links
 Official website
 Partizanopedia 1985-86  (in Serbian)

FK Partizan seasons
Partizan
Yugoslav football championship-winning seasons